Four Rode Out is a 1971 Spanish/American adventure/western film starring Sue Lyon, Pernell Roberts and Leslie Nielsen.

Plot
In this western, a Mexican desperado tries to flee his partner, a determined girlfriend, and a US Marshal.

Cast
Sue Lyon as Myra Polsen 
Pernell Roberts as U.S. Marshal Ross 
Julián Mateos as Fernando Núñez 
Leslie Nielsen as Mr. Brown 
María Martín as Rosa 
Leonard Bell as Hotel Clerk 
John Clark as Livery Stable Owner 
Charles Drace as Mr. Polsen 
Neil Wright as Priest 
Janis Ian as The Singer

See also
 Cinema of Spain

References

External links
 
 

English-language Spanish films
1971 Western (genre) films
1971 films
American Western (genre) films
Spanish Western (genre) films
Films shot in Almería
1970s English-language films
Films directed by John Peyser
1970s American films